Bobby Joe Banes Jr. (born April 7, 1967) is a former offensive tackle who played one season with the Indianapolis Colts of the National Football League. He was drafted by the Houston Oilers in the eleventh round of the 1990 NFL Draft. He played college football at the University of Houston and attended Klein High School in Klein, Texas. Banes was also a member of the New York/New Jersey Knights of the World League of American Football.

References

External links
Just Sports Stats

Living people
1967 births
Players of American football from Houston
American football offensive tackles
Houston Cougars football players
Indianapolis Colts players
New York/New Jersey Knights players
Klein High School alumni